Henry Selby Msimang (13 June 1886 - 29 March 1982) was a South African political leader and activist.

Biography
After attending primary school at Edendale he qualified as a teacher at Healdtown in 1907. He became a court interpreter in 1908 and then worked as a postmaster in Krugersdorp. In 1913 became the secretary of the anti-Natives Land Act committee. He became court interpreter at Vrede in 1914 and promoted the employment of African clerks and dip inspectors in the Free State. He joined the African National Congress at its inception.

In 1919 he helped to establish the Industrial and Commercial Workers' Union in Bloemfontein, and edited a newspaper called
Messenger-Morumioa. He returned to Johannesburg in 1922, and to Pietermaritzburg in 1941, where he was secretary of the Natal ANC, and then joined the Liberal Party in 1953. He was a founding member of the Liberal Party and a member of the National Committee. He was a lay preacher in the Methodist Church. He died in 1982 aged 95.

Publications

  Published as Topical talks number 25, by The South African Institute of Race Relations: Johannesburg. [Date of publication and copyright status unknown. Available at the Alan Paton Centre, University of KwaZulu-Natal, for study and research purposes.]

References

External links
 SAHistory: Henry Selby Msimang

1886 births
1982 deaths
South African trade unionists
Anti-apartheid activists
South African Methodists
Liberal Party of South Africa politicians